Touch Your Heart is a 2019 South Korean television series starring Yoo In-na and Lee Dong-wook. It is based on the web novel of the same name, which was first published in 2016 on KakaoPage. It aired on tvN from February 6 to March 28, 2019.

Synopsis
Top actress Oh Jin-shim (Yoo In-na), who goes by the stage name Oh Yoon-seo, has a scandal that damages her career, leaving her jobless for two years until she has a chance to earn a major role in an upcoming drama. However, in order to clear her name and secure success, she must first take a job working as a secretary to a lawyer named Kwon Jung-rok (Lee Dong-wook). Eventually, they fall in love and the events following form the crux of the story.

Cast

Main
 Yoo In-na as Oh Jin-shim / Oh Yoon-seo (stage name), a top star who loses her fame after getting embroiled in a drug scandal with a third-generation chaebol. In order to make a comeback by starring in a famous writer's project, she gets field experience in law by posing as Jung-rok's secretary.
 Lee Dong-wook as Kwon Jung-rok, a workaholic elite lawyer who always wins his cases and cares deeply about his firm's reputation.
 Lee Sang-woo as Kim Se-won, Jung-rok's best friend who is an elite prosecutor.
 Son Seong-yoon as Yoo Yeo-reum, a prosecutor, whom Jung-rok had a crush on. She and Se-won dated in school, but he broke her heart.

Supporting

Always Law Firm
 Oh Jung-se as Yeon Joon-kyu, the CEO of Always Law Firm. An ardent fan of Yoon-seo.
 Shim Hyung-tak as Choi Yoon-hyuk, a divorce lawyer.
 Park Kyung-hye as Dan Moon-hee, a straightforward and honest civil defense attorney.
 Park Ji-hwan as Lee Doo-seob, a paralegal and former detective.
 Jang So-yeon as Yang Eun-ji, a legal secretary with ten years of experience.
 Kim Hee-jung as Kim Hae-young, an assistant legal secretary. She has great interest in everyone's private lives.
Lee Jong-hwa as Lee Jong-hwa, an intern lawyer who is a fan of Jin-shim.
 Lee Kyu-sung as Kim Pil-gi, an intern lawyer who is a fan of Jin-shim.

People around Jin-shim
 Lee Jun-hyeok as Yeon Joon-suk, the CEO of Yeon Entertainment, Jin-shim's agency, who discovered and made her an actress.
 Oh Eui-shik as Kong Hyuk-joon, Jin-shim's manager of ten years. He is very loyal and considers Jim-shim as his younger sister.
 Jay Kim as Lee Kang-joon, a chaebol heir and Jin-shim's stalker.

Seoul District Prosecutor Office
  as Lee Joo-young, Se-won's junior.
  as Prosecutor Im, Yeo-reum's senior who often puts her down.
  as a prosecutor and Yeo-reum's boss
  as a chief prosecutor
  as Kim Hyung-shik from Se-won's team
  as Yoo Hyun-ji from Se-won's team
 Jin So-yeon as Yeo-reum's legal secretary
  as Yeo-reum's investigator

Others
 Kim Soo-jin as Lee Se-jin, the writer of the drama that Jin-shim wants to star in.
 Kim Dae-gon as Park Soo-myung
 Son Se-bin as Kim Min-ji, Jin-shim's rival.
 Yoo Eun-mi as Seo Jin-hee, Eun-ji's daughter.
 Song Duk-ho as Deok-ho
 Baek Eun-hye as Insurance agent	
 Yoo Yeon as Im Yoon-hee

Special appearances
  as a host (Ep. 1)
 Jang Ki-yong as an actor (Ep. 1)
  as Moon-hee's client (Ep. 1)
 Lee Yoon-sang as a judge (Ep. 1, 5-6)
  as an angry driver (Ep. 2)
  as Jung-rok's client (Ep. 2)
  as Moon-hee's client (Ep. 2)
  as a Subway part-timer (Ep. 2, 8, 10)
 Jo Soo-min as Kim Yoon-ha, Jung-rok's client (Ep. 3)
 Hwang Chan-sung as a delivery man (Ep. 3 & 5)
 Hwang Seung-eon as an actress (Ep. 4)
  as an actor (Ep. 4)
 Lee Yoo-mi as Seung-hee, Jung-rok's client (Ep. 4)
  as Seung-hee's ex-boyfriend (Ep. 4)
 Hwang Bo-ra as Hwang Yeon-du, Jin-shim's senior and rival (Ep. 7)
  as a café owner (Ep. 8)
 Park Ji-il as Kwon Jae-bok, Jung-rok's father (Ep. 10)
 Song Kang as a deliveryman (Ep. 13)
  as a judge (Ep. 13)
 Moon Ji-hoo as himself portraying the male lead Jeong-do in Lee Se-jin's new drama (Ep. 15)
  as Jung-rok's blind date (Ep. 16)

Production
 Lead stars Yoo In-na and Lee Dong-wook previously worked together in 2016 series Guardian: The Lonely and Great God.
 The male lead role was first offered to Jung Kyung-ho.
 The first script reading of the cast was held on November 27, 2018 at Studio Dragon's head office in Sangam-dong, Seoul; and filming started in the same month.
 Actor Shin Dong-wook was originally cast for the role of Kim Se-won, but later stepped down from the series amidst controversies surrounding fraud claims and a subsequent lawsuit. He was replaced by actor Lee Sang-woo.

Original soundtrack

Part 1

Part 2

Part 3

Part 4

Part 5

Part 6

Part 7

Part 8

Viewership

Awards and nominations

Notes

References

External links
  
 Touch Your Heart at Studio Dragon 
 Touch Your Heart at Mega Monster 
 Touch Your Heart at HighZium Studio 
 Touch Your Heart (original novel) at KakaoPage 
 
 

TVN (South Korean TV channel) television dramas
Korean-language television shows
2019 South Korean television series debuts
2019 South Korean television series endings
South Korean romance television series
South Korean romantic comedy television series
Television shows based on South Korean novels
Television series by Studio Dragon
Television series by Mega Monster
Television series by Zium Content